Nowa Biała  (German: Colonie Schröttersdorf) is a village in the administrative district of Gmina Stara Biała, within Płock County, Masovian Voivodeship, in east-central Poland.

Nowa Biała had a population of 229 at the 2011 census.

The village is located on a broad alluvial plain and is an important river crossing.
The village is known for a series of large rocky outcrops on the river bank.
The town has a school on the periphery, and at the center is a small shopping strip opposite a parish church.

References

Villages in Płock County